The English progressive rock band Yes has toured for five decades.

Yes's Spring 2020 North American Tour (cancelled) 
With support from the Alan Parsons Live Project (except as indicated).

On 11 March 2020, Yes announced that they had cancelled their Spring 2020 U.S. dates and their appearances on the 7th "Cruise To The Edge" due to various factors including unavailable insurance coverage.

Yes's Cruise to the Edge 2020 (cancelled) 
On 11 March 2020, Yes announced that they had cancelled their Spring 2020 U.S. dates and their appearances on the 7th "Cruise To The Edge" due to various factors including unavailable insurance coverage.

The Album Series Tour 2020 (postponed then rescheduled to 2021) 
Yes were due to embark in Spring 2020 on their new tour entitled Album Series Tour 2020. The show would have comprised two sets (with full production and a high definition video wall): the first set featuring a selection of favourite classic tracks from Yes's extensive catalogue and the second set featuring their 1974 Relayer (seventh studio) album in its entirety. The (23-date) European leg was due to kick off on 24 April in Lisbon, Portugal and end on 24 May in Leuven, Belgium while the (9-date) UK & Ireland leg of the tour was due to start on 26 May in Liverpool and end on 7 June in Dublin, Ireland with a penultimate show on 5 June 2020 at the Royal Albert Hall, London, UK.

On 20 March 2020, it was announced that the entire tour had to be postponed due to the COVID-19 pandemic and that it would be rescheduled in 2021.

The Album Series Tour 2021 (rescheduled to 2022) 
Yes were due to embark in Spring 2021 on the (24-date) European leg of their new (rescheduled) tour entitled Album Series Tour 2021 and to perform Relayer in its entirety and other Yes classics. All previous 2020 tickets were valid for the new shows.

On 23 March 2021, Yes announced that, due to COVID restrictions across Europe "and for everyone's safety", they had to cancel their forthcoming European & UK Album Series 2021 Tour (initially from 11 April to 28 May) and to reschedule it in Spring 2022 (from 12 May to 29 June).

The Album Series Tour 2022 (cancelled and partially rescheduled to 2023) 
Yes were due to play their twice rescheduled tour, now entitled Album Series Tour 2022, performing Relayer in its entirety and other Yes classics. All shows in all cities from the 2021 tour were rescheduled apart from the Luxembourg one, and tickets remained valid for the new dates.

However, on 8 March 2022 the band announced that the UK and Ireland dates would now celebrate the 50th anniversary of Close to the Edge. Additionally, on 21 April it was announced that all mainland European dates were rescheduled to 2023 due to "logistical problems caused by the on-going pandemic".

Close to the Edge 50th Anniversary Tour 2022

To celebrate the 50th anniversary of the band's acclaimed record Close to the Edge, Yes had announced that the tour dates of the 2022 Album Series Tour would be rescheduled and the band would be performing Close to the Edge instead of Relayer in its entirety. The band decided to dedicate the tour to the recently passed Alan White. A Japanese leg and an American leg were also added.

Lineup:
Steve Howe – guitars, vocals
Jon Davison – vocals, acoustic guitar
Geoff Downes – keyboards
Billy Sherwood – bass, vocals
with:
Jay Schellen - drums, percussion

Opening Tracks:
 "Turn Of The Century"  (Jon Anderson, Howe, White)
 "Firebird Suite"  (Igor Stravinsky)

Setlist:
 "On The Silent Wings Of Freedom" (Anderson, Chris Squire)
 "Yours Is No Disgrace" (Anderson, Squire, Howe, Tony Kaye, Bill Bruford)
 "No Opportunity Necessary, No Experience Needed" (Richie Havens, Jerome Moross) (omitted on 13 June 2022, dropped for Japan leg, added back in on 6 October 2022)
 "Does It Really Happen" (Downes, Trevor Horn, Howe, Squire, White)  (dropped after Japan leg)
 "Clap" (Howe) (omitted on 13 June 2022, 17, 20 October 2022)
 "Wonderous Stories" (Anderson) (omitted on 17 October 2022)
 "The Ice Bridge" (Davison, Francis Monkman, Downes)
 "Dare To Know" (Howe) (omitted on 13 June 2022, removed during Japan leg, added back in on 6 October 2022)
 "Heart Of The Sunrise" (Anderson, Squire, Bruford) (omitted on 12 September 2022)

Close to the Edge:
 "Close To The Edge" (Anderson, Howe)
 "And You And I" (Anderson, Squire, Bruford, Howe)
 "Siberian Khatru" (Anderson, Howe, Rick Wakeman)

Encores:
 "Roundabout" (Anderson, Howe)
 "Starship Trooper" (Anderson, Squire, Howe)

Occasionally played:
 "Video Killed the Radio Star" (played on 12 September 2022)
 "Leaves of Green" (played on 12 September 2022)
 "To Be Over" (replaced "Clap" on 5, 8, 12 September 2022, 6, 8, 17 October 2022)
 "Sketches in the Sun" (replaced "Clap" on 11 October 2022)
 "Second Initial" (replaced "Clap" on 14 October 2022)

A Yes consisting of Trevor Rabin, Jon Davison, Geoff Downes, and Billy Sherwood (with Jay Schellen on drums) appeared at the "Alan White - Celebrating His Life In Music" tribute concert at the Paramount Theatre in Seattle on 2 October 2022.

The Album Series Tour 2023 
The Album Series Tour featuring Relayer will now take place in May and June 2023, after being rescheduled for the third time. Only the mainland European dates were rescheduled. The Luxembourg date, which the band was not able to accommodate in the 2022 tour, is added back. A UK leg was later added.

References

External links
Yesworld: The Official Yes website Past & present versions
Forgotten Yesterdays (A Comprehensive Guide To Yes Shows)

2020s
2020s-related lists
Lists of concert tours